Poppo II may refer to:

 Poppo, Duke of Thuringia (died after 906)
 Poppo II, Margrave of Carniola (died 1098)